Face (stylized as  : FACE) is the debut extended play (EP) by South Korean singer-songwriter Solar, the leader and main vocalist of Mamamoo, released on March 16, 2022, by RBW.

Background and release

On February 22, 2022, the first teaser for Face was released. It shows a face motion logo of Solar's new EP Face. The EP title was inspired by the hanja 容, pronouncing yong, from the singer's real name Kim Yong-sun. She described the concept of Face as her true and sincere self, as well as an appreciation towards self-love, uniqueness, and beauty, "just as the faces of people living in the world are all different, each and every one of them is precious." In particular, as her face reflects emotions and the path that person has walked, Solar plans to show various colors of music by comparing her sincere thoughts, feelings, and values.

The lead single "Honey" was written and composed by Solar, Kim Do-hoon, and Seo Young-bae. An accompanying music video for "Honey" was released simultaneously with the single. "Honey" is a witty and kitsch song about how people tempt her sweetly, just like bees bring honey to the queen bee.

Track listing

Critical reception

容 : Face has been met with positive critical acclaim from reviews. NME critic Rhian Daly gave the album a 4 out of 5 score, and stated "‘容 : FACE’ captures Solar’s energetic, bright and breezy personality well. The rap verse on ‘Honey’ is a particular highlight that showcases her dynamism, while the mini-album as a whole pops with little vocal details that subtly elevate the songs." In addition, Honey has been listed as one of the 'Best K-pop Track of 2022' by British magazine Dazed. Dazed stated "Solar often changes the sense of speed and atmosphere in the song, which further emphasizes the meaning of the lyrics written by Solar herself, doubling the feeling of challenge. It is a sweet yet bright and bold song."

Year-end lists

Charts

Weekly charts

Monthly charts

Release history

References

2022 EPs
Kakao M EPs
Korean-language EPs